Geoffrey Winston Bradfield (born 28 February 1948) was a South African cricketer who played for Northamptonshire. He was born in Grahamstown, Cape Province.

Bradfield made a single first-class appearance, during the 1970 season, against Cambridge University. Coming in at 6, Bradfield batted quite well scoring 50 runs in the first innings in the only innings he batted. Northamptonshire won the match by 103 runs however, surprisingly, Bradfield never played again.

External links
Geoffrey Bradfield at Cricket Archive

1948 births
South African cricketers
Northamptonshire cricketers
Living people
People from Makhanda, Eastern Cape
Cricketers from the Eastern Cape